Verkhnesaldinsky District is an administrative district (raion), one of the thirty in Sverdlovsk Oblast, Russia. As a municipal division, it is incorporated as Verkhnesaldinsky Urban Okrug. Its administrative center is the town of Verkhnyaya Salda. Population (excluding the administrative center): 3,306 (2010 Census);

References

Notes

Sources

Districts of Sverdlovsk Oblast